Jean Sommeng Vorachek (February 24, 1933 – July 14, 2009) was the Roman Catholic bishop of the Vicariate Apostolic of Savannakhet, Laos.

Ordained a Roman Catholic priest on June 29, 1963, Pope John Paul II appointed Vorachek bishop of the Vicariate Apostolic of Savannakhet. He was ordained bishop on October 19, 1997.

Notes

1933 births
2009 deaths
20th-century Roman Catholic bishops in Laos
21st-century Roman Catholic bishops in Laos